Prudhoe Community High School  is a coeducational high school and sixth form located in Prudhoe, Northumberland, England.

Situated on Moor Road, Prudhoe, pupils range from year 9 to year 13 (years 12 and 13 being sixth form).

The school was opened in 1958, starting with over 400+ pupils, and has expanded over the years. The school now serves around 1,000 students.

In September 2016 the new all in one school building opened its doors. This replaced the old, outdated campus buildings.

The Old School Building
The school used to consist of several buildings and departments (housed within 'blocks'). The main school building was where the maths, languages, and sciences departments were based, as well as ICT rooms, the Contemporary Arts department, the music department, and part of the PE department.

Other buildings included the humanities block, where the student support areas (Pastoral and Learning Support teams), finance office, and administrative staff were based.  It was also where the Humanities department, consisting of history, geography, and ethics, was based. The block also housed the Drama department and a Police Office (which was staffed by Northumbria Police).

The school included an English block, a Sixth form study area, a DT and Business and ICT block, an Engineering building, and a full sports hall and gymnasium. The Art Building was opened by HM Queen Elizabeth II in May 1998.

The old sports hall used to include a squash court, a fitness room, and a large gym with cricket batting nets, two small and one large basketball court. In the main building there was also a gymnastics hall.

The school had on average one IT classroom per department (with art, maths, and contemporary arts departments being the only departments not to have an IT room).

New School Building 
In March 2015 it was announced that Prudhoe would be getting a full new school rebuild following years of campaigning by a range of organisations and individuals including the local authority, representatives from the High School, local elected representatives and the wider local community. The tender for the building work was won by Sir Robert McAlpine who carried out the main construction. Various other contractors worked on the site including Owen Pugh and Armac Demotion.

The new building came at a cost of around £12.5m. Building work on it officially begun in the end half of 2015 and opened in September 2016. Located on the existing school site, The work entailed demolition of the existing main school building and part demolition of the existing sports hall, the erection of a two-storey school building, phased relocation, reconfiguration of vehicular and pedestrian access and laying out of associated car parking, cycle parking, boundary treatments and landscaping.

The scheme was built under the Priority Schools Building Programme and work was funded by the Education Funding Agency following a successful bid to the agency from Northumberland County Council.

When the old school closed there was a large fire in the old hall. It caused a lot of damage and made the area temporarily unsafe due to asbestos in the roof.

The finished landscaping and car parking is due to be completed by the end of Summer 2017.

Technology
Prudhoe Community High School used to be a specialist technology college, although from 2011 students were not obliged to study a technology subject at GCSE level. Currently courses include textiles, electronics, resistant materials, food, graphics (I.C.T. and traditional) and the 14–19 nationally acknowledged engineering diploma.

IT facilities 
The school now has 7 IT classrooms. As an educational establishment within the Northumberland LEA, PCHS has full WiFi access for staff and students in all of its buildings and outside coverage as well.

Every classroom in the school has at least one PC, with portable laptops available to students.

Learning Resource Centre
Prudhoe Community High School supports its pupils through a learning resource centre (known also as the LRC), which includes a library, career advice centre, creative area, and 26 computers for use by students.

Clubs
The Learning Resource Centre hosts to several after-school clubs. These include the year nine reading group and a homework club.

Sports facilities
Outside the building are some basketball and tennis courts.

The school also has three large playing fields. One has athletics facilities (a sand pit and running track), one has football posts and the third is a 5G astro-turf pitch. The schools sporting facilities were reduced in wake of the construction of the FUSE Media Centre but have now been fully reinstated.

References

External links
 Official site
 UK Government statistics
 Ofsted Reports

Upper schools in Northumberland
Educational institutions established in 1958
1958 establishments in England
Academies in Northumberland
Prudhoe